Andryala is a genus of flowering plants in the family Asteraceae. It is native to Europe, North Africa, and the Middle East.

 Accepted species

References

Asteraceae genera
Cichorieae
Taxa named by Carl Linnaeus